Ronaldão can refer to:

Ronaldão (footballer) (born 1965), Brazilian footballer 
Ronaldão (stadium), a football stadium in Poços de Caldas, Brazil